West Finland College is the oldest Finnish-speaking Folk High School operating in the village of Loima, Huittinen. This religiously and politically independent educational institution was founded in 1892.

The mission of West Finland College is to guide and support students in achieving personal, cultural and educational goals in accordance with lifelong learning principles.  Along with that, the school promotes the sense of community and internationality of education.

The historical and cultural venues of the College like the Assembly hall are where numerous meetings, seminars and celebrations are held. The Chimney Hall is located on the river bank and is a very popular place for arranging events. In autumn 2010 a new stage with seats were added to the Chimney hall. Dormitories are either new or fully renovated. Over 90% of College's students live in the dormitories.

Informal adult education 

The College is a well known and one of the biggest educational institutions focused on informal adult education in Finland. Every year over a thousand students from different countries study a variety of courses presented by the College. The courses cover foreign languages, theatre and arts studies as well as preparatory courses for entrance exams for medicine, law, economics etc.

Along with these, the College provides education for immigrants, especially marginalized risk groups and those who need educational rehabilitation. The College participates in different national and international projects, focused on strengthening the internationality of education and developing informal adult educational studies.

Courses

Languages 

The College offers English, Finnish and Russian language studies. The English course lasts for 9 months and includes a period of study abroad. The 2-month-long Finnish courses are arranged in Autumn and Spring time. Summer time is mostly filled with 2-week-long English-language camps. Courses in Russian are presented on request.

Theatre and Arts 

The college presents a Dance course and a unique English Drama Course. The course leaders are professional actors and award-winning dance teachers. These courses last 9 months.

Performing Arts Academy 

West Finland College Performing Arts Academy offers an opportunity to develop oneself in the field of theatre, dance, music and general performing. The main goal of the course is to offer the participants plenty of opportunities for performing. Along with that, the students study English language in a creative and fun way with professional instructors. The working language of the course is English.

Preparation courses 

The College mainly arranges preparation courses in Medicine for those who want to have University entrance.

History 

West Finland College was founded in 1892 to serve the educational needs of the countryside population and support ideology of "Finnishness". In the beginning the education was practical oriented:  skills needed in traditional agrarian society were taught, like agriculture and housekeeping.
During the war period the College worked as an artillery school and later as a military hospital. The international connections of the College began from the late 1950s when the first student exchanges with Great Britain, Western Germany and the Netherlands took place. The College was the first Finnish folk high school, which started student exchange activities. Starting from the 1960s the range of courses offered by the College was enlarged and students  started coming from other regions than Satakunta.

Principles / directors of the College

References

External links 
Länsi-Suomen opisto

Adult education
Secondary schools in Finland
Educational institutions established in 1892
1892 establishments in Finland